Phidippus arizonensis is a spider in the family Salticidae ("jumping spiders"), in the infraorder Araneomorphae ("true spiders").
The distribution range of Phidippus arizonensis includes the United States and Mexico.

References

Salticidae
Spiders described in 1883